Clinton is a city in Henry County, Missouri, United States. The population was 8,792 at the 2020 census. It is the county seat of Henry County.

History
Clinton was laid out in 1836.  The city was named for New York Governor DeWitt Clinton, a key promoter of the Erie Canal. A post office called Clinton has been in operation since 1850. The railroad reached Clinton in 1870, when the Census put the population at 840. 

Clinton was incorporated as the least-populous type of city in Missouri, a fourth-class city, in 1878. All but one voter voted in favor of incorporation. Resident Banton G. Boone, a Democrat, was Speaker of the Missouri House of Representatives, 1875-1877, and Missouri Attorney General, 1885-1889.

Piped water, electricity, and macadam roads were brought in during the 1880s, and a telephone system in the 1890s.

In 1905, Clinton and the rest of Henry County held two separate votes on prohibition of alcohol. Clinton's vote was against prohibition, while the rest of the county voted in favor, creating two separate legal regimes. In 1909, another such local option vote in Clinton gave the same result, against prohibition.

The town square, the focal point of the Clinton Square Historic District, has been the site of various disasters. In 1876, a fire burned down a number of buildings on the square. The cause is believed to have been arson. On June 26, 2006, a building there collapsed while an Elks Lodge meeting was taking place, leading to the death of the Lodge's leader, Tony Komer. Nine people were pulled from the rubble, while the rest left on their own power. In the Olde Glory Days parade, which occurred less than one week after the accident, Komer was memorialized and Elk's Lodge members from many parts of Western Missouri marched to show their support for the Clinton Lodge.

In addition to the Historic District overall, the Anheuser-Busch Brewing Association Building, William F. and Julia Crome House, Judge Jerubial Gideon Dorman House, Gustave C. Haysler House, and C.C. Williams House are listed on the National Register of Historic Places.

Geography
Clinton is located at  (38.370067, -93.771689).

The downtown square serves as a center for community commerce and public affairs. It features a central courthouse and numerous shops, stores, and eating facilities. More than one dozen churches are found in the community, a few of which antedate 1900. Several important state highways intersect at Clinton, including Routes 13 & 7, making Clinton a popular stop on the Springfield-Kansas City Route. and a cluster of "big-box" stores, as well as several "national-chain" motels, are located in that area. Smaller motels are found on the outskirts of town on all sides. The several residential neighborhoods range from directly adjacent to the town square to lying a mile or more away. In terms of wealth, the neighborhoods go from solidly lower income, to middle-class ranch-house areas to a small, affluent borough, where larger lawns and brick-and-Tudor homes predominate.

Climate

Demographics

2010 census
At the 2010 census there were 9,008 people, 3,935 households, and 2,371 families living in the city. The racial makup of the city was 95.1% White, 1.9% African American, 0.4% Native American, 0.3% Asian, 0.5% from other races, and 1.8% from two or more races. Hispanic or Latino of any race were 2.0%.

Of the 3,935 households 27.9% had children under the age of 18 living with them, 42.2% were married couples living together, 13.3% had a female householder with no husband present, 4.8% had a male householder with no wife present, and 39.7% were non-families. 34.5% of households were one person and 16.1% were one person aged 65 or older. The average household size was 2.24 and the average family size was 2.82.

The median age was 40.6 years. 22.6% of residents were under the age of 18; 8.5% were between the ages of 18 and 24; 23.4% were from 25 to 44; 25.1% were from 45 to 64; and 20.5% were 65 or older. The gender makeup of the city was 46.9% male and 53.1% female.

2000 census
At the 2000 census there were 9,311 people, 3,978 households, and 2,502 families living in the city. The population density was 1,007.6 people per square mile (389.1/km). There were 4,342 housing units at an average density of 469.9 per square mile (181.4/km).  The racial makup of the city was 95.49% White, 1.77% African American, 0.92% Native American, 0.31% Asian, 0.50% from other races, and 1.00% from two or more races. Hispanic or Latino of any race were 1.03%.

Of the 3,978 households 27.8% had children under the age of 18 living with them, 47.0% were married couples living together, 12.1% had a female householder with no husband present, and 37.1% were non-families. 33.1% of households were one person and 16.3% were one person aged 65 or older. The average household size was 2.26 and the average family size was 2.84.

The age distribution was 23.4% under the age of 18, 8.8% from 18 to 24, 25.6% from 25 to 44, 21.2% from 45 to 64, and 20.9% 65 or older. The median age was 39 years. For every 100 females, there were 88.4 males. For every 100 females age 18 and over, there were 82.7 males.

The median household income was $28,079 and the median family income  was $32,378. Males had a median income of $26,834 versus $19,096 for females. The per capita income for the city was $16,282. About 11.9% of families and 15.5% of the population were below the poverty line, including 21.0% of those under age 18 and 13.3% of those age 65 or over.

Education
Clinton School District operates five schools, including Clinton Sr. High School.

Clinton has a public library, a branch of the Henry County Library.

Arts and culture
On September 12, 2007, the Tour of Missouri bicycle race began stage 2 from Clinton. The initial take off began from the historic downtown square, and ended in Springfield.

Clinton lies at the western terminus of the Katy Trail, a 225-mile long state park used by cyclists, runners and horseback riders. The rail trail is built on the path of the old Missouri-Kansas-Texas Railroad, which was abandoned between Clinton and Sedalia in 1989. The former Katy railroad from Clinton south to Nevada is still operated by the Missouri and Northern Arkansas Railroad (Genesee & Wyoming). The city is also situated near Truman Lake, which is widely known for its excellent boating, fishing, camping, and other related activities. Clinton is also home to two of the area's 18-hole golf courses.  On December 27, 2021, Clinton's AM radio station announced they will cease broadcasting effective December 31, 2021 after losing their tower site. (KDKD-AM)

Notable people
 Virgil Hill, Olympic boxing silver medalist, member of International Boxing Hall of Fame
 Uel W. Lamkin, Henry County schools superintendent and president of Northwest Missouri State University
 Steve Luebber, MLB pitcher and Minor League baseball pitching coach
 Nick Petree, Minor League baseball player 
 Delbert Lee Scott, politician, college president
 David Steward, World Wide Technology founder, chairman

References

External links

 Official website
 Historic maps of Clinton in the Sanborn Maps of Missouri Collection at the University of Missouri

Cities in Henry County, Missouri
County seats in Missouri
Cities in Missouri